Netze may refer to:

Noteć, a river in central Poland (German name Netze)
Netze (Eder), a river of Hesse, Germany, tributary of the Eder
Netze District, a territory in the Kingdom of Prussia
DB Netze, a German railway infrastructure manager (Deutsche Bahn)
Netze, a district of the town Waldeck, Hesse, Germany